The paramerion (Medieval Greek: Παραμήριον) was a saber-like curved sword used by the Byzantine military. The one-edged cutting weapon was primarily used by  Byzantine cavalry and took inspiration from similar swords of the Middle East. Other scholars consider that it was directly influenced by the sabres used by Turkic steppe peoples, such as the Pechenegs and Cumans, that the Byzantines employed as mercenaries or who served in the Byzantine army. The name paramerion means 'by the thigh', this may reflect that it was worn suspended by slings from a waist-belt, rather than the usual baldric employed by Byzantines for straight double-edged swords.

References

Byzantine military equipment
Ancient swords